Mateo Sujatovich, also known for the musical project Conociendo Rusia, is an Argentine musician. As Conociendo Rusia he has released three albums, his homonymous debut in 2018, Cabildo y Juramento in 2019 and La Dirección in 2021. He has received several awards and nominations for the Gardel Awards and Latin Grammy Awards, including Best New Artist at the 21st Annual Latin Grammy Awards.

Career
Sujatovich alongside his band Conociendo Rusia, whose name comes from his nickname "El Ruso", released his debut album Conociendo Rusia in 2018, accompanied by Nicolas Btesh (synthesizers and backing vocals), Guille Salort (drums) and Fran Azorai (keyboards). The next year, they released their second album, Cabildo y Juramento, which featured production from Nicolás Cotton and arrangements by Leo Sujatovich, the album was nominated for Best Pop/Rock Album at the 21st Annual Latin Grammy Awards. At the Gardel Awards of 2020, the project was nominated for Album of the Year while Cotton was nominated for Producer of the Year and Record Engineer of the Year with Pablo Lopez Ruiz.

Due to the COVID-19 pandemic, the band had to postpone their concert at the Teatro Gran Rex in Buenos Aires and decided to make a series of virtual concerts under the name E-World Tour in 2020 to promote the second album. In 2020, they released "Tu Encanto", a collaboration with Argentine singer Fito Páez.

Influences
Among his influences, Sujatovich mentions the British band The Beatles alongside Argentine rock singers such as Luis Alberto Spinetta, Charly García and Gustavo Cerati.

Personal life
Sujatovich is the son of the Argentine musician and keyboardist of the band Spinetta Jade, Leo Sujatovich, with whom he shares a recording studio they called "Club Atlético Sujatovich". His sister is the singer and songwriter Luna Sujatovich.

Discography
 Conociendo Rusia (2018)
 Cabildo y Juramento (2019)
 La Dirección (2021)

Awards and nominations

Gardel Awards

Latin Grammy Awards

References

Argentine musicians
Living people
Year of birth missing (living people)